Prionoxystus is a genus of moths in the family Cossidae.

Species
 Prionoxystus macmurtrei Guérin-Meneville, 1829
 Prionoxystus piger Grote, 1865
 Prionoxystus robiniae Peck, 1818

References

Natural History Museum Lepidoptera generic names catalog

Cossinae